Kanni is a village in Kyain Seikgyi Township, Kawkareik District, in the Kayin State of Myanmar. It is located on the Zami River.

References

External links
 "Kanni Map — Satellite Images of Kanni" Maplandia World Gazetteer

Populated places in Kayin State